Garci Sánchez de Badajoz (1460?–1526?) was a Spanish writer and poet. He was an author of lovers' complaints which were popular with the poets of the Renaissance.

His family came from the low Extremaduran nobility of Badajoz but in the 15th century they settled in Écija. The General Songbook (1511) includes a large number of his compositions, and others appear in loose sheets and in the Romance Songbook. According to Fray Jerónimo Román, Sánchez de Badajoz was an eminent musician who played the vihuela.

References

Spanish male writers
People from Écija
Date of birth unknown
Date of death unknown
Year of birth uncertain